Events in the year 1837 in Norway.

Incumbents
Monarch: Charles III John

Events
14 January – Formannskapsdistrikt was created in a bill approved by the Parliament of Norway and signed into law by King Carl Johan.

Arts and literature
Strömberg Theatre re-opened under the name Christiania Theatre.

Births

8 February – Elise Aubert, novelist, short-story writer, and non-fiction writer (d. 1909).
18 February – Johannes Bergh, barrister (d. 1906).
16 March – Hassa Horn Sr., civil servant (d. 1921)
25 March – Lauritz Jenssen, businessperson and politician (d.1899)
19 April – Fredrik Meltzer Wallem, journalist and writer (d. 1922)
20 April – Georg Ossian Sars, marine biologist (d.1927)
11 May – Lorentz Severin Skougaard, singer (d. 1885)
14 July – Hermann Hansen Aarsrud, politician (d. 1927).
27 July – Ole Vollan, educator, editor and politician (d.1907)
18 August – Marcus Pløen Ingstad, jurist and educator (d. 1918)
5 September – Vincent Stoltenberg Lerche, painter (d. 1892).
16 September – Rasmus Theisen, civil servant and politician (d. 1908)
26 September – Hjalmar Heiberg, physician and a professor (d. 1897).
8 October – Otto Winter-Hjelm, musician, conductor, writer, composer and music critic (d. 1931) 
15 October – Carl Herman Halvorsen, jurist and politician (d. 1918)
18 November – Johannes Skar, educator and folklorist (d. 1914).
18 December – Paul Andreas Jetmundsen Aklestad, politician (d.1924)
20 December – Georg August Thilesen, politician and Minister (d. 1917).

Full date unknown
Ole Herman Johannes Krag, gun designer (d.1916)
Hans Mustad, businessperson (d.1918)
Carl Ingwart Theodor Rynning, government official and politician (d. 1892)

Deaths

8 February – Jens Johan Vangensten, politician (b.1766)
26 February – Jørgen Young, merchant and politician (b. 1781).
11 March – Peder von Cappelen, merchant and politician (b. 1763).
15 March – Eilert Waldemar Preben Ramm, military officer and politician (b. 1769).
27 April – Lorentz Johannsen, merchant and member of the Storting (b. 1769)
5 October – Ole Knudsen Tvedten, farmer and district sheriff (b. 1757/8)
14 December – Andreas Arntzen, politician (b.1777)

Full date unknown
Christian Adolph Diriks, politician and minister (b.1775)

See also

References